He Jianxin (born 1992) is a professional wushu taolu athlete from Hong Kong.

Career

Junior career 
After joining the Guangdong Provincial Wushu team in 2008, He competed in the 2009 Asian Junior Wushu Championships and won the gold medal in women's group A nanquan.

Senior career 
After being transferred to Hong Kong, He made her international debut at the 2017 World Wushu Championships where she became the world champion in nandao and nangun and a bronze medalist in nanquan. This qualified her for the 2018 Taolu World Cup where she was a double gold medalist once again in nandao and nangun. Her most recent competition was at the  2019 World Wushu Championships where he was a double gold medalist in nangun and duilian with Yuen Ka Ying and Liu Xuxu, and a bronze medalist in nanquan.

Awards 
Hong Kong Sports Stars Awards

 Outstanding athlete of Hong Kong (2017)

References 

Hong Kong wushu practitioners
Living people
1992 births